Storrun Wind Farm is a 30 MW wind farm in Krokom in Jämtland, Sweden. The wind farm was opened on 26 September 2009. It consists of 12 Nordex 2.5 MW N90 wind turbines. The developer and operator of the wind farm is Storrun Vindkraft AB, a joint venture of Ørsted A/S (80%) and Borevind AB (20%). Due to the northern location, the project includes anti-ice coated blades and estimation of production losses caused by icing. The wind farm was sold in 2014 to the Australian pension fund Prime Super.

See also

List of large wind farms
List of wind farms in Sweden

References

Wind farms in Sweden
Ørsted (company) wind farms